Stark County is in Illinois. According to the 2010 census, it had a population of 5,994. Its county seat is Toulon.

Stark County is part of the Peoria, IL Metropolitan Statistical Area.

History
Stark County was formed in 1839 out of Knox and Putnam counties. It was named for General Colonel John Stark (August 28, 1728 – May 8, 1822), who served in the American Continental Army during the American Revolutionary War. He became widely known as the "Hero of Bennington" for his exemplary service at the Battle of Bennington in 1777.  

In the latter part of April, 1829 a solitary, heavily laden wagon was wending its way from the hospitable home of Mr. French, at Prince's Grove, about a half mile north-west of the present town of Princeville, towards Spoon River, probably crossing that stream at a point since known as Boardman's Ford, or, as others think, near the seat of Cox's Mill, and moving on towards section fifteen in what has since been known as Essex Township.

The weather was warm and balmy considering the season. The prairie burnt over by the Indians in the fall was already green with sprouting grass. Accompanying this vehicle were as it might seem a guard of good men, and true; "neighbors" they called themselves, although they must have lived many miles apart, some of them thirty or forty from the scene of their present friendly labors, having come from LaSalle Prairie, from Chillicothe and Peoria. They were neither hunters or warriors, they feared no enemy, and sought not the "spoils of war".

It was a peaceable expedition and its leader was the occupant of the wagon, Isaac B. Essex, then in the strength of his manhood, and with him came his young wife and infant child to found a home in the wilderness. The "neighbors" were Daniel Prince, Stephen French, Simon Reed, Frank Thomas and two Baptist ministers, Elders Silliman and Allen. The former of these two was the father of the much respected Toulon townsman Minott Silliman, the first treasurer of Stark county. And these men had come so far to raise a cabin!

Mr. Essex had been out and made a claim in 1828, and in the fall of that year cut the logs and split the clap-boards for his house, probably all of which were on the northeast quarter of section fifteen. They now proceeded to haul them together and get them in shape on the proposed building site. They all camped in the woods the first night, but towards sundown of the second day, the cabin was raised, the roof on, and as Mr. Essex graphically said "we cut a log out and moved in."

This was emphatically the first pioneer cabin, the first home of non-Native American settlers within the present limits of Stark County.

Geography

Climate and weather

Major highways
  Illinois Route 17
  Illinois Route 91
  Illinois Route 40
  Illinois Route 93
  Illinois Route 78

Adjacent counties
 Henry County (northwest)
 Bureau County (north)
 Marshall County (east)
 Peoria County (south)
 Knox County (west)

Demographics

As of the 2010 census, there were 5,994 people, 2,425 households, and 1,673 families residing in the county. The racial makeup of the county was 97.7% white, 0.5% black or African American, 0.3% Asian, 0.2% American Indian, 0.3% from other races, and 1.0% from two or more races. Those of Hispanic or Latino origin made up 1.0% of the population. In terms of ancestry, 33.5% were German, 15.5% were Irish, 13.8% were English, 10.8% were American, and 9.8% were Swedish.

Of the 2,425 households, 28.9% had children under the age of 18 living with them, 56.6% were married couples living together, 8.0% had a female householder with no husband present, 31.0% were non-families, and 26.8% of all households were made up of individuals. The average household size was 2.43 and the average family size was 2.93. The median age was 43.8 years.

The median income for a household in the county was $49,195 and the median income for a family was $62,681. Males had a median income of $44,931 versus $29,621 for females. The per capita income for the county was $25,311. About 7.6% of families and 11.2% of the population were below the poverty line, including 17.0% of those under age 18 and 4.8% of those age 65 or over.

Communities

Cities
 Toulon
 Wyoming

Villages
 Bradford
 La Fayette

Unincorporated communities

 Castleton
 Duncan
 Elmira
 Lombardville
 Modena
 Morse
 Speer
 Stark

Townships
Stark County is divided into these townships:

 Elmira
 Essex
 Goshen
 Osceola
 Penn
 Toulon
 Valley
 West Jersey

Politics

Since the American Civil War, Stark County has been heavily Republican, like most of Yankee-influenced Northern Illinois. The only Democratic presidential nominee to carry Stark County in the past 150 years has been Franklin D. Roosevelt in 1932, although Bob Dole won by just sixteen votes against Bill Clinton in 1996, and Progressive Theodore Roosevelt won the county in 1912 when the Republican Party was mortally divided between Roosevelt and conservative incumbent William Howard Taft.

See also
 National Register of Historic Places listings in Stark County

References

External links
 Stark County Website
 The Stark County News
 Wyoming IL Chamber of Commerce
 Wyoming IL Lions Club
 Tanners Orchard

 
Illinois counties
1839 establishments in Illinois
Populated places established in 1839
Peoria metropolitan area, Illinois